Zambar is a small desert village in Tel Afar District of Nineveh Governorate of northern Iraq. It is located about halfway between Tel Afar and the larger settlement of Shaikh Ibrahim, further to the southeast.

History
The Germans discovered oil at Zanbar and Qusair in the 1930s and began drilling; a team of German and Italian workers were deployed to tap the resources.

Geography
A stream runs intermittently down from the mountain.

References

External links
Maplandia

Populated places in Nineveh Governorate